Target Nevada may refer to:
 Target Nevada (band), a super-group
 Target Nevada (film), a 1951 documentary short film